The 250 nm process (250 nanometer process or 0.25 µm process) is a level of semiconductor process technology that was reached by most manufacturers in the 1997–1998 timeframe.

Products featuring 250 nm manufacturing process
The DEC Alpha 21264A, which was made commercially available in 1999.
The AMD K6-2 Chomper and Chomper Extended. Chomper was released on May 28, 1998.
The AMD K6-III "Sharptooth" used 250 nm.
The mobile Pentium MMX Tillamook, released in August 1997. 
The Pentium II Deschutes.
The Pentium III Katmai.
The Dreamcast's CPU and GPU.
The initial version of the Emotion Engine processor used in the PlayStation 2.

00250
Computer-related introductions in 1998